Dip Gogoi (born 17 December 1951) is an Indian politician who was a Member of Parliament from Lok Sabha. He represents the Kaliabor constituency in Assam and is a member of the Indian National Congress.

Background
Dip Gogoi is a brother of Tarun Gogoi who was former chief minister of Assam. Dip Gogoi was educated at Dibrugarh University and graduated with a B.Sc. degree. He is married to Mitali Gogoi.

Political career
Gogoi has served one term as a Member of the Legislative Assembly (MLA). He was elected to the Assam state assembly from the Titabar constituency in 2001 but vacated the seat a few months later for his brother Tarun Gogoi. Gogoi has since served three terms as a Member of Parliament (MP) from the Lok Sabha. He was elected from Kaliabor in the 2002 by-elections (seat vacated by his brother) and was re-elected in 2004 and 2009. Gogoi is a member of the Indian National Congress.

References

1951 births
Tai peoples
Indian National Congress politicians
Living people
India MPs 2004–2009
People from Jorhat district
India MPs 1999–2004
Lok Sabha members from Assam
Assam MLAs 2001–2006
Dibrugarh University alumni
India MPs 2009–2014
Indian National Congress politicians from Assam